Sitionuevo is a town and municipality of the Magdalena Department in northern Colombia.

References

External links
 Sitionuevo official website
 Gobernacion del Magdalena - Sitio Nuevo

Municipalities of Magdalena Department